Florian Stablewski (German: Florian von Stablewski; 16 October 1841 – 24 November 1906) was a Polish priest and politician, Archbishop of Poznań and Gniezno, and member of the Prussian Landtag.

Stablewski was born in Wschowa and died in Poznań.

References 
 Witold Jakóbczyk, Przetrwać na Wartą 1815-1914, Dzieje narodu i państwa polskiego, vol. III-55, Krajowa Agencja Wydawnicza, Warszawa 1989

External links
 
 Virtual tour Gniezno Cathedral  
List of Primates of Poland 

1841 births
1906 deaths
People from Wschowa
People from the Province of Posen
Archbishops of Gniezno
Bishops of Poznań
Polish politicians
Members of the Prussian House of Representatives
19th-century Roman Catholic archbishops in Germany
20th-century Roman Catholic archbishops in Germany
Catholic clergy of the Prussian partition
20th-century German Roman Catholic priests